Moshe Hogeg (born May 15, 1981) is an Israeli businessman.

Early life 
Hogeg was born in Beersheba on May 15, 1981, in the Southern District of Israel, and grew up in the nearby local council of Meitar. He identifies as an Arab Jew, his father was born in Tunisia and his mother in Morocco.

Arrest, investigation and criminal charges 
Hogeg was arrested in November 2021 over alleged sex-crimes involving underage children and cryptocurrency-related fraud. Hogeg is suspected to have committed sodomy, human trafficking, committing an act of prostitution involving a minor, running a place of prostitution and several other charges pertaining to cryptocurrency fraud. He was subsequently released on a $22 million bail bond to house arrest. Following the arrest, Moshe's Ferrari was repossessed by the state of Israel and soon after publicly auctioned.

In June 2022, the Israeli police announced their recommendation to the state attorney's office to charge Moshe Hogeg for a variety of criminal charges related to children including sodomy, human trafficking, committing an act of prostitution involving a minor, running a place of prostitution, providing drugs to underage kids, and several other charges related to cryptocurrency fraud. 

In July 2022, Hogeg was re-arrested by the Israeli police for failing to fulfill his court ordered bail bond requirement.

Business ventures 
In 2010, Hogeg founded Mobli, which reportedly attracted numerous celebrity investors including Carlos Slim, Serena Williams, and Leonardo di Caprio. One investor was Kazakh businessman Kenges Rakishev; the two later founded a venture capital firm that became known as Singulariteam, which was one of the most active firms in Israel for a time. In April 2014, he co-founded Yo app, the app was valued at between $5 and $10 million in July 2014.

Hogeg became active in cryptocurrency, donating $1.9 million to Tel Aviv University for blockchain research and founding the Alignment Blockchain Hub. In 2017 and 2018, he led three initial coin offerings (ICOs) for his companies Sirin Labs, Stx Technologies Limited, and Leadcoin, raising over $250 million combined.  In June 2018, Hogeg purchased an acre of land in Kfar Shmaryahu, a suburb of Tel Aviv, for 70 million shekels (US$19.3 million). Hogeg paid 15 percent of the purchase price in Bitcoin, believed to be the first real estate transaction in Israel conducted with the cryptocurrency.

Hogeg has invisted as well in several ventures including, Moonactive, StoreDot and Delek Group.

Throughout his business career, Hogeg has faced lawsuits over his ventures from investors and former employees, including former members of Singulariteam. Most were settled out of court with plaintiffs signing nondisclosure agreements.

Beitar Jerusalem FC 
Hogeg was relatively unknown in Israeli football before he acquired Beitar.

On July 15, 2021, Hogeg announced the cancellation of a planned match between Beitar and FC Barcelona, after Barcelona refused to hold the event in the disputed city of Jerusalem. Hogeg said that he was "a proud Jew and Israeli" and could not "betray Jerusalem". In August 2022, Hogeg sold Beitar Jerusalem to Barak Abramov.

References 

1981 births
Living people
21st-century Israeli businesspeople
Businesspeople from Beersheba
Beitar Jerusalem F.C.
Arab Jews
Israeli people of Moroccan descent
Israeli people of Tunisian descent